Jules Pappaert (known as Petatje, 5 November 1905 – 30 December 1945) was a Belgian footballer.

He was a defender and captain of Union Saint-Gilloise in the 1930s. He was Belgian champion three times consecutively from 1933 to 1935. Union were unbeaten for 60 matches.

He played four matches for the Diables Rouges from 1932 to 1934, but the results were not as good as they had been at club level: 3 defeats, 1 draw, 10 goals scored, 23 goals conceded.

The Jules Pappaert Cup was named after him.

Honours 
 Belgian international from 1932 from 1934 (4 caps)
 First cap : 11 December 1932, Belgium-Austria, 1–6 (friendly)
 Participation in the 1934 World Cup (did not play)
 Belgian Champions in 1933, 1934 and 1935 with R. Union Saint-Gilloise
 176 matches and 16 goals in Division 1

References 

Belgian footballers
Belgium international footballers
1934 FIFA World Cup players
Royale Union Saint-Gilloise players
1905 births
1945 deaths
Association football defenders